Matteau is a French surname. Notable people with the surname include:

 Stefan Matteau (born 1994), Canadian hockey player
 Stéphane Matteau (born 1969), Canadian hockey player, father of Stefan

French-language surnames